Don Ji-Deok (born 28 April 1980) is a South Korean footballer who plays as defender for FC Anyang in K League Challenge.

References

External links 

1980 births
Living people
Association football defenders
South Korean footballers
Goyang KB Kookmin Bank FC players
FC Anyang players
Korea National League players
K League 2 players